The Queen Latifah Show was the title of two American television talk shows hosted by Queen Latifah. The original The Queen Latifah Show ran from September 13, 1999, to August 31, 2001. The revamped The Queen Latifah Show debuted September 16, 2013, and was renewed for a second season in January 2014. On November 21, 2014, due to low ratings, Sony Pictures Television cancelled The Queen Latifah Show after two seasons. Production ended on December 18, 2014, and the final episode aired on March 6, 2015, with reruns that continued airing until the end of the television season.

The Queen Latifah Show (1999–2001)
This syndicated series aired from September 13, 1999, to August 31, 2001. It was described as the "Dear Abby for the Hip-Hop Generation", with the series covering various topics and including interviews with celebrities and non-celebrities alike.

The Queen Latifah Show (2013–2015)
The revamped show premiered on September 16, 2013.

The Queen Latifah Show featured celebrity interviews, human interest stories, musical performances, and Queen Latifah's take on pop culture news. Latifah also ventured into communities across the country.

The Queen Latifah Show was taped in front of a live studio audience at Sony Pictures Studios in Culver City, California, and aired in broadcast syndication on CBS Television Stations. The series was produced by Flavor Unit Entertainment, Overbrook Entertainment, and Sony Pictures Television. The set for the series was designed by Lenny Kravitz's design firm, Kravitz Design.

This incarnation debuted with the second-best daytime talk launch since The Dr. Oz Show in 2009, premiering with a 1.7 rating/5 share primary-run household average in the weighted metered markets. Latifah's premiere was also up 31% from its year-ago time periods and up 21% from its average lead-in. In daytime's key demographic of women 25–54, the series surged 80% from last year and 29% from its lead-ins to a 0.9/5.

On January 6, 2014, The Queen Latifah Show was renewed for a second and final season. However, on November 21, 2014, Sony Pictures Television canceled Queen Latifah's show due to declining ratings. Production of the series ended, taking effect on December 18, 2014, leaving new episodes that were broadcast until March 6, 2015.

Awards and nominations
At the 40th People's Choice Awards in 2014, Queen Latifah won the Favorite New Talk Show Host award.

References

External links
  (2013–2015)
  (1999–2001)

1990s American television talk shows
2000s American television talk shows
2010s American television talk shows
1999 American television series debuts
2001 American television series endings
2013 American television series debuts
2015 American television series endings
English-language television shows
First-run syndicated television programs in the United States
Queen Latifah
Television series by Sony Pictures Television
Television series by Telepictures
American television series revived after cancellation